Mangelia kraussi is a species of sea snail, a marine gastropod mollusk in the family Mangeliidae.

Description
The length of the shell attains 3.3 mm, its diameter 1.5 mm.

Distribution
This marine species occurs off Port Alfred, South Africa.

References

External links
  Tucker, J.K. 2004 Catalog of recent and fossil turrids (Mollusca: Gastropoda). Zootaxa 682:1–1295.
 

Endemic fauna of South Africa
kraussi
Gastropods described in 1932